On October 5, 2022, the U.S. Judicial Panel on Multidistrict Litigation (JPML) transferred some 66 autism and ADHD lawsuits to Senior District Judge Denise Cote in the Southern District of New York, thus consolidating all such acetominophen birth defect cases in a mass tort. The case specifically concerns the lack of warning regarding in utero use. On 2022-11-19 Judge Cote among other matters ruled against Walmart's preemption argument (which is often raised in pharmaceutical mass tort cases). Given the significant media attention and advertising the class action has been receiving, the number of plaintiffs is widely anticipated to considerably increase.

References

United States District Court for the Southern District of New York cases